Norman West (26 November 1935 – 7 September 2009) was a British Labour Party politician.

Born in Worsborough near Barnsley, West studied at Barnsley Grammar School before becoming a coal miner at Barrow Colliery, the local mine in Worsborough. He joined the National Union of Mineworkers, and supported Arthur Scargill in his early years.

West also became active in the Labour Party, and was elected to South Yorkshire County Council, and then at the 1984 European Parliament election as the MEP for Yorkshire South.  In this role, he supported the UK miners' strike, and was a member of the Socialist Campaign Group.

West stood down as an MEP in 1998, and remained resident in Worsborough until his death in 2009.

References

1935 births
2009 deaths
Councillors in South Yorkshire
Labour Party (UK) councillors
Labour Party (UK) MEPs
MEPs for England 1984–1989
MEPs for England 1989–1994
MEPs for England 1994–1999
People from Barnsley